Creška is an abandoned village in the municipality of Štip, North Macedonia.

Demographics

The settlement last had inhabitants in the 1961 census, where it was recorded as being populated by 38 Albanians and 9 Turks.

According to the 2002 census, the village had 0 inhabitants. Ethnic groups in the village include:

References

Villages in Štip Municipality
Albanian communities in North Macedonia